Robert Ramillon was a French professional tennis player of the 1930s and was the winner of French Pro in 1932. He also played in the finals in 1931 and 1936. In 1928 he won the title at the Queen's Club Pro tournament.  He was also runner-up at the Southport tournament in 1937 (beating Bill Tilden before losing to Hans Nüsslein). At the wartime Tournoi de France, held at Roland Garros, he was runner-up in 1941 to Bernard Destremau.

See also
Dan Maskell

References

 Tennis Server, "Between the Lines" by Ray Bowers

1909 births
1964 deaths
French male tennis players
Professional tennis players before the Open Era
Sportspeople from Cannes